The 2021 Midwestern State Mustangs football team represented Midwestern State University in the 2021 NCAA Division II football season. They were led by head coach Bill Maskill, who was in his 20th season at Midwestern State. The Mustangs played their home games at Memorial Stadium and were members of the Lone Star Conference.

Previous season
The Mustangs finished the 2020 season 1–2. On August 12, 2020, the Lone Star Conference postponed fall competition in 2020 for several sports due to the COVID-19 pandemic. A few months later in January 2021, the conference announced that there will be no spring conference competition in football. Teams that opt-in to compete would have to schedule on their own. The Mustangs played four games in Spring 2021.

Schedule
Midwestern State announced their 2021 football schedule on March 24, 2021.

Rankings

References

Midwestern State
Midwestern State Mustangs football seasons
Midwestern State Mustangs football
Lone Star Conference football champion seasons